Missone's spider gecko (Rhinogekko misonnei), also known commonly as de Witte's gecko, de Witte's spider gecko, Misonne's swollen-nose gecko, and Witte's gecko, is a species of lizard in the family Gekkonidae. The species is native to Western Asia.

Etymology
The specific name, misonnei, is in honor of Xavier Misonne who is a Belgian anthropologist and zoologist.

Geographic range
R. misonnei is found in Iran and Pakistan. The IUCN Redlist considers its presence in Pakistan uncertain.

Habitat
The preferred natural habitat of R. misonnei is desert.

Reproduction
R. misonnei is oviparous.

References

Further reading
Akbarpour M, Shafiei S (2015). "Range extension of Misonne's swollen-nose gecko, Rhinogecko misonnei de Witte, 1973 (Sauria: Gekkonidae) in Iran". Iranian Journal of Animal Bioststematics 11 (2): 179–182.
de Witte G-F (1973). "Description d'un Gekkonidae nouveau de l'Iran (Reptilia, Sauria)". Bulletin de l'Institut Royal des Sciences Naturelles de Belgique 49 (1): 1–6. (Rhinogekko misonnei, new species). (in French).
Sindaco R, Jeremčenko VK (2008). The Reptiles of the Western Palearctic. 1. Annotated Checklist and Distributional Atlas of the Turtles, Crocodiles, Amphisbaenians and lizards of Europe, North Africa, Middle East and Central Asia. (Monographs of the Societas Herpetologica Italica). Latina, Italy: Edizioni Belvedere. 580 pp. . (Rhinogecko misonnei, p. 126).
Šmíd J, Moravec J, Kodym P, Kratochvíl L, Yousefkhani SSH, Rastegar-Pouyani E, Frynta D (2014). "Annotated checklist and distribution  of the lizards of Iran". Zootaxa 3855 (1): 001–097. (Rhinogekko misonnei, p. 25).

Rhinogekko
Lizards of Asia
Geckos of Iran
Reptiles of Pakistan
Taxa named by Gaston-François de Witte
Reptiles described in 1973